Mamounata Nikiéma (1979—) is a Burkinabé producer and director. She was trained at the Gaston Berger University of Saint-Louis, Senegal. She was General Secretary of l'association Africadoc Burkina (the Burkinabé Africadoc Association) from 2009 to 2014.

Biography 
Mamounata Nikiéma was born in 1979 in Burkina Faso. She first trained in communications at the University of Ouagadougou. In 2001, she won a literary Baccalaureate, prompting her further into journalism, and in 2008 she received a masters in documentary creation from Gaston Berger University, a qualification she pursued after leaning away from journalism and towards film. In 2009, she was made General Secretary of l'association Africadoc Burkina, a position held until 2014. She set up her own company, Pilumpiku Production, in 2011. In October 2017, she was one of the three winners of the B-Faso Creative program. She was awarded the Audience Award at the Ouagadougou Festival of Cultural Identities in November 2018.

Filmography

As director 

 Lumière d'octobre (2015); 75 minute documentary about the 2014 Burkinabé uprising
 Vue d'Afrique (2013)
 Savoir raison garder (2011)
 Une journée avec (2011)
 Kounkoli, le pleurer rire à Darsalamé (2009)
 Manges-tu le riz de la vallée (2008)

As producer 

 Femmes, entièrement femmes (2013)

References

External links 
 

1979 births
Burkinabé women
Burkinabé film directors
Burkinabé film producers
Living people
21st-century Burkinabé people